Dionysis Tsamis (born 21 May 1951) is a Greek former professional footballer who played as a midfielder.

Club career
Tsamis started his football career at Panetolikos youth team, at the age of 16. The team's coach at the time, Lukas Aurednik immediately recognized his rich talent and expressed flattering words about the youngster to the club's managers. The following year the coach of the team Sotiris Karpodinis took him to the preparation of the men's team. He played as a substitute in a friendly against Arta and impressed with his performance and thus established himself in the first team. He soon became an international player with the Youth and Hope national teams. A law of the regime at the time that allowed the transfer of players only within a prefecture or in a neighboring prefecture stopped the transfer of Tsamis to a team from Athens. His common spell with Apostolos Toskas in the squads of the youth national teams contributed to his desire to transfer to AEK Athens. When Branko Stanković saw him in a friendly match between Panetolikos and AEK in Agrinio, he immediately suggested his transfer, which took place in an episodic way. The then head of the group, Stamatis Papastamatiou, was forced to flee and hide Tsamis in the houses of friends and acquaintances so that he would not be claimed by the other big clubs. The transfer was completed for around 2.3 million drachmas, a record amount for the time, but the obstacles that kept coming in and delaying the issuance of a sports card to the footballer forced him to stay on the stand for about a year before he played for the first time in the second leg of the UEFA Cup against in Liverpool on November 8, 1972. Tsamis helped the club in the first difficult years, but was also in the golden era of ownership of Loukas Barlos that followed. The team of Barlos and the manager Fadrhonc, where Tsamis was a starter, exceled in Greece and abroad as they progressed to the UEFA Cup semi-final in 1977. winning 2 Championships and 1 Greek Cup including a double in 1978. Tsamis played "box-to-box" and certainly owed a lot to the training of Fadrhonc who worked on his talent and developed him into an ultra-modern footballer. During his spell with the yellow-black jersey he without never received a card, a fact that demonstrates in addition to his footballing acumen and his morals. He always formed a successful duo with his partners in midfield and was one of the most important footballers in the history of the club. In 1980 he left AEK and signed for Korinthos where he ended his career in 1982 at the age of just 31.

International career
Tsamis was capped twice with Greece. He was called for the first time in April 1974, but did not play for the team that faced Brazil at the Maracana Stadium and his debut took place a year later, on 1 April 1975, in a 2–1 friendly away win against Cyprus, while on 10 November 1976 he made his last appearance in the home friendly match against Austria.

After football
Tsamis, alongside football, he studied at the Physical Education Academy and obtained his degree while actually competing as a professional at AEK Athens. He retired from football after being appointed as a physical education teacher in 1982, a position he served until his retirement. He maintains football academies in his hometown of Agrinio and frequently attends the events of the veterans of AEK, without being an integral member of them.

Honours

AEK Athens
Alpha Ethniki: 1977–78, 1978–79
Greek Cup: 1977–78

References

External links

1951 births
Living people
Association football midfielders
Greek footballers
Greece international footballers
Panetolikos F.C. players
AEK Athens F.C. players
Korinthos F.C. players
Super League Greece players
Footballers from Agrinio